Stuttering therapy is any of the various treatment methods that attempt to reduce stuttering to some degree in an individual. Stuttering can be a challenge to treat because there is a lack of evidence-based consensus about therapy. Some believe that there is no cure for the condition.

Approaches

There are many different approaches to stuttering therapy. While some believe that there is no cure for the condition, stuttering can be reduced and even eliminated with appropriate timely intervention, and various therapy methods have reduced stuttering in individuals to some degree. In any case, for all persons who stutter, the success of speech therapy depends on the combination of education, training, and individualized treatment provided.

For a child that stutters, the focus of treatment is to prevent the worsening of the condition, and families play an important role in the process. Successful elimination of mild stuttering is likely when treatment is initiated before four years of age. For those who have more advanced forms of stuttering and secondary behaviors, therapy is generally a variation or combination of two approaches: a fluency-shaping technique that replaces stuttering with controlled fluency, and stuttering modification therapy, which focuses on reducing the severity of stuttering.

Therapy for children

Treatment of mild stuttering in children younger than six years of age focuses on the prevention or elimination of stuttering behaviors. Families play an important role in the management of stuttering in children: therapy is usually characterized by parental involvement and direct treatment, and providing an environment that encourages slow speech, affording the child time to talk, and modeling slowed and relaxed speech can help reduce stuttering.

The Lidcombe Program
Lidcombe therapy has become prominent in recent years and is effective in preschoolers and young children who stutter, involves a parent or some significant person in the child's life being trained and delivering treatment in the child's everyday environment. In the program, family members are to provide an environment in which the child receives praise for fluent speech in the child's daily speaking and, occasionally, correction of stuttering. Some of the most effective preschool intervention programs call for direct acknowledgment of stuttering in the form of contingencies such as "that was bumpy" or "that was smooth". Research and clinical trials have shown that the Lidcombe Program can eliminate stuttering for the most part and fluency can be maintained through a criterion based maintenance program, when stuttering begins in the first few years of life.

Fluency shaping

Fluency shaping therapy focuses on changing all the speech of the person who stutters, and not just the portions of speech in which he or she stutters. This type of therapy involves teaching the stutterer to use a speaking style that requires careful and prominent self-monitoring; examples of such therapy include one in which the stutterer slows his speech down and smoothes out all his words,  This type of approach can reduce stuttering, although in children its effectiveness decreases if stuttering persists after eight years of age;

Certain devices, known as fluency-shaping mechanisms, use this approach in an attempt to reduce stuttering. For example, delayed auditory feedback devices encourages the slowing down of speech by replaying the stutterer's words. The stutterer is then forced to slow her rate of speech to prevent distortions in the speech that is heard through the device. The effectiveness of such devices varies with stuttering severity.

Modifying Phonation Intervals (MPI)

The Modifying Phonation Intervals (MPI) Stuttering Treatment Program is very effective in training adults who stutter to achieve generalized fluent and natural sounding speech by learning to speak with a reduced number of short intervals of phonation. The program is designed to be a computer-aided, bio-feedback program that requires appropriate software (MPI smartphone app) and hardware (a throat microphone headset) which records the phonation intervals, or PIs, from the surface of the speaker’s throat.

The app records all PIs as well as speaker-rated speech performance measures. All PIs recorded within a specified ms range are able to be fed back in real time to the speaker via graphics and audio signal. It is this PI feedback that the speaker uses in order to learn to reduce the frequency of target range PIs and which reduces the speaker’s frequency of stuttering.

The MPI Stuttering Treatment Program is based on a series of experimental studies by Roger Ingham and colleagues (Gow & Ingham, 1992; Ingham, Kilgo, Ingham, Moglia, Belknap, & Sanchez, 2001; Ingham, Montgomery, & Ulliana, 1983). These studies have demonstrated that adults who stutter can learn to control the frequency of relatively short intervals of phonation (e.g., 30–150 ms) during oral reading and spontaneous speaking tasks. These studies have also demonstrated that adults who stutter can be trained to reduce the frequency of those same PIs (known as target range phonation intervals or TRPIs) by at least 50% while still achieving natural-sounding speech. The effect is that stuttering will also be reduced or eliminated without necessarily reducing the rate of speech.

Recent findings have shown that therapy benefits will generalize and can be sustained for at least 12 months after the completion of treatment.

The MPI Stuttering Treatment Schedule is divided into 4 phases. Those phases are Pre-Treatment, Establishment, Transfer, and Maintenance. Each phase is designed to be managed jointly by the speaker (person who stutters) and the clinician. The Pre-Treatment phase is directed by the clinician, but the other phases are largely self-managed while also requiring regular validation by a clinician.

Stuttering modification

Stuttering modification therapy, also known as traditional stuttering therapy, was developed by Charles Van Riper between 1936 and 1958. It focuses on reducing the severity of stuttering by changing only the portions of speech in which a person stutters, to make them smoother, shorter, less tense and hard, and less penalizing. This approach attempts to reduce the severity and fear of stuttering, and strives to teach stutterers to stutter with control, and not to make the stutterer fluent. Therapy using this approach tends to recognize the fear and avoidance of stuttering, and consequently spend a great deal of time helping stutterers through those emotions.

Integrative approaches

Integrative approaches combine fluency shaping and stuttering modification techniques; there is a wide variety of such approaches.

Contemporary devices

Contemporary devices used to reduce stuttering alters the frequency of the speaker’s voice to mimic the “choral effect”, a phenomenon in which person's stutter decreases or ceases completely when she is speaking with a group of others, or slows the rate of speech through delayed auditory feedback (above). Studies on the long-term outcome of these devices have not been published.

Diaphragmatic breathing

Several treatment initiatives advocate diaphragmatic breathing (or costal breathing) as a means by which stuttering can be controlled.

Self-therapy and support groups

Support groups

As of 2002, stuttering support groups had gained prominence and visibility and were rapidly becoming an important part of the recovery process for stutterers, even though the vast majority of adults who stutter did not participate in support groups (or treatment). A growing number of speech–language pathologists were also encouraging their clients to participate in support groups, even though little was known about the individuals that joined stuttering support groups and the benefits they derived from their participation.

Recent research shows that participating in support groups and self-help sessions with others who stutter may reduce the negative attitudes associated with stuttering. Becoming part of stuttering groups may help reduce the feelings of loneliness, fear, shame and embarrassment that comes with years of stuttering. Participants of group sessions show lower internalization of stigma regarding stuttering. They have lower levels of negative feelings about themselves. Moreover, the goal of helping others who stutter in the group has been linked to better psychological well-being.

Studies in the United States involving members of support groups of the National Stuttering Association have found that 57.1% of survey respondents said that the support group had affected their self-image "very positively", with no respondents indicating that it had a negative impact.

Cognitive Behavioral Therapy

Cognitive behavioral therapy (CBT) is sometimes used to help people who stutter; as of 2010 the evidence base for its efficacy was weak. A recent series of case studies demonstrate that CBT may be partially effective in helping clients reduce their secondary behaviors, anxiety, and cognitive distortion. Cognitive behavioral therapy is a collaborative process that requires the client and the therapist working together to explore the buried feelings of frustration, avoidance, anger, and self-doubt. Younger children who stutter are more benefited by CBT as compared to adults who stutter. Research at the Michael Palin Center has shown that CBT is a powerful tool for all children who stutter.

Pharmacologic therapy

Several pharmacologic, i.e. drug-based, methods to control or alleviate stuttering events have been studied, but each has either proved ineffective or have had adverse effects. In addition, no large-scale trials on pharmacologic therapy have been published, and there are no trials including children. A comprehensive review of pharmacologic interventions for stuttering showed that no agent leads to valid improvement in stuttering or in secondary social and emotional consequences.

See also
 "The Monster Study", 1939 experiment condemned for using mockery of orphans' speech as a corrective tool
Speech-language pathology
Annie Glenn, famous stutterer who was cured later in life
Stuttering

Organizations
American Speech–Language–Hearing Association
British Stammering Association
The Indian Stammering Association
Israel Stuttering Association (AMBI)
National Stuttering Association, United States

References

External links
Stammering assessment and management
Stuttering and professional like speech language pathologist
Stutter No More – The Fast, Simple, Proven Technique with an Astonishing Long-Term Success Rate  by Dr. Martin F. Schwartz, Executive Director of The National Center for Stuttering (Simon & Schuster Ltd; Reprint Edition, 1992, available in full for online borrowing at Internet Archive with a free account, for 14 days)
Childhood Stuttering (1SpecialPlace Blog) – information about childhood stuttering, journal about stuttering in children

Stuttering